The James S. Dixon Trophy is a Canadian Football League trophy, formerly awarded to the East Division champions.  The winner of this trophy faced the winner of the N. J. Taylor Trophy for the Grey Cup. Both the James S. Dixon Trophy and N. J. Taylor Trophy were retired in 2004.

The Dixon Trophy was originally presented in 1912 by James S. Dixon of Hamilton to the Inter-Provincial Rugby Football Union to represent its championship, which it continually did even as the IRFU changed names to the present-day East Division.  In 1995, as part of the failed American expansion, it was presented to the winners of the South Division.

James S. Dixon Trophy winners
 Bold text represents the eventual Grey Cup champions.

 2003 - Montreal Alouettes
 2002 - Montreal Alouettes
 2001 - Winnipeg Blue Bombers
 2000 - Montreal Alouettes
 1999 - Hamilton Tiger-Cats
 1998 - Hamilton Tiger-Cats
 1997 - Toronto Argonauts
 1996 - Toronto Argonauts
 1995 - Baltimore Stallions
 1994 - Baltimore CFLers
 1993 - Winnipeg Blue Bombers
 1992 - Winnipeg Blue Bombers
 1991 - Toronto Argonauts
 1990 - Winnipeg Blue Bombers
 1989 - Hamilton Tiger-Cats
 1988 - Winnipeg Blue Bombers
 1987 - Toronto Argonauts
 1986 - Hamilton Tiger-Cats
 1985 - Hamilton Tiger-Cats
 1984 - Hamilton Tiger-Cats
 1983 - Toronto Argonauts
 1982 - Toronto Argonauts
 1981 - Ottawa Rough Riders
 1980 - Hamilton Tiger-Cats
 1979 - Montreal Alouettes
 1978 - Montreal Alouettes
 1977 - Montreal Alouettes
 1976 - Ottawa Rough Riders
 1975 - Montreal Alouettes
 1974 - Montreal Alouettes
 1973 - Ottawa Rough Riders
 1972 - Hamilton Tiger-Cats
 1971 - Toronto Argonauts
 1970 - Montreal Alouettes
 1969 - Ottawa Rough Riders
 1968 - Ottawa Rough Riders
 1967 - Hamilton Tiger-Cats
 1966 - Ottawa Rough Riders
 1965 - Hamilton Tiger-Cats
 1964 - Hamilton Tiger-Cats
 1963 - Hamilton Tiger-Cats
 1962 - Hamilton Tiger-Cats
 1961 - Hamilton Tiger-Cats
 1960 - Ottawa Rough Riders
 1959 - Hamilton Tiger-Cats
 1958 - Hamilton Tiger-Cats
 1957 - Hamilton Tiger-Cats
 1956 - Montreal Alouettes
 1955 - Montreal Alouettes
 1954 - Montreal Alouettes
 1953 - Hamilton Tiger-Cats
 1952 - Toronto Argonauts
 1951 - Ottawa Rough Riders
 1950 - Toronto Argonauts
 1949 - Montreal Alouettes
 1948 - Ottawa Rough Riders
 1947 - Toronto Argonauts
 1946 - Toronto Argonauts
 1945 - Toronto Argonauts
 1944 - not awarded
 1943 - not awarded
 1942 - not awarded
 1941 - Ottawa Rough Riders
 1940 - Ottawa Rough Riders
 1939 - Ottawa Rough Riders
 1938 - Toronto Argonauts
 1937 - Toronto Argonauts
 1936 - Ottawa Rough Riders

References

Defunct Canadian Football League trophies and awards